Lyra Veronica Esmeralda Taylor  (11 July 1894 – 1979) was a New Zealand lawyer and social worker. She spent much of her career in Australia.

Taylor was born on 11 July 1894 in Stratford, New Zealand.

Taylor studied law at the Victoria University of Wellington, and was "called to the bar" in 1918, the first woman to be a barrister in Wellington. In 1919, Taylor was made partner at a law firm which duly renamed itself as Kirk, Wilson, and Taylor.

In early 1940 Taylor was appointed general secretary of the Y.W.C.A. in New South Wales. In 1944 she started work with the Australian Department of Social Services. Taylor was sent on a 10 month study tour of England, Canada and the United States sponsored by the Carnegie Trust.

Taylor was a founding member of the Australian Association of Social Workers.

References

Australian public servants
1894 births
1979 deaths
People from Stratford, New Zealand
Victoria University of Wellington alumni
New Zealand social workers
Australian Officers of the Order of the British Empire